Griswold (also spelled Griswald) is a surname of English origin, from the Old English greosn (‘gravel’) and weald (‘woodland’). However, some interoperations consider Griswold to mean "Gris" meaning "Grey" and "wold" meaning wood/forest. The surname Gris is a name of ancient French origin. It was a Breton name given to a person with gray hair. The name Gris is derived from the Old French word "gris," which means "gray," and was often given to someone with gray hair. The name Wold is derived from the Old English wald meaning "forest", (cognate of German Wald, but unrelated to English "wood", which has a different origin). Wold is an Anglian form of the word, as in other parts of England, different variations can be found. Notable people with the surname include:

 A. Minor Griswold (1834–1891), American humorist, journalist, and lecturer, known by his pen name The Fat Contributor
 Alexander Viets Griswold (1766–1843), Protestant Episcopalian bishop and evangelist in the U.S.
 Alfred Whitney Griswold (1906–1963), president of Yale University
 Bill Griswold, American computer scientist
 Daniel T. Griswold, director of the Cato Institute's Center for Trade Policy Studies
 Deirdre Griswold, American politician
 Don T. Griswold (1917–1943), U.S. Navy ensign
 Dwight Griswold (1893–1954), American politician
 Edith Julia Griswold (1863-1926), American lawyer and patent expert
 Erwin Griswold (1904–1994), U.S. Solicitor General
 Florence Griswold (1850–1937), founder of the "Lyme Art Colony" in Old Lyme, Connecticut
 Frances Irene Burge Griswold (1826–1900), American writer
 Francis H. Griswold, (1904–1989),  U.S. Air Force lieutenant general  
 Frank Griswold (1937–2023), 25th presiding bishop of the Episcopal Church
 Gaylord Griswold (1767–1809), American politician
 Glenn Griswold (1890–1940), American politician
 George Griswold (died 1857), American politician
 Harry W. Griswold (1886–1939), American politician
 Hattie Tyng Griswold (1842-1909), American writer, poet
 John Ashley Griswold (1822–1902), American politician
 John Augustus Griswold (1822–1872), American politician
 Kate E. Griswold (c. 1869-?), American editor, publisher, proprietor
 Larry Griswold (1905–1996), American gymnast
 Mabel E. Griswold (1888-1955), American activist
 Mark Griswold, American engineer
 Matthew Griswold (congressman) (1833–1919), American politician
 Matthew Griswold (governor) (1714–1799), American politician
 Morley Griswold  (1890–1951), American politician
 Oscar Griswold (1886–1959), American general during World War II
 Putnam Griswold (1875–1914), American singer
 Ralph Griswold (1934–2006), American computer scientist
 Robert Griswold (born 1996), American swimmer
 Robert E. (Bob) Griswold (born 1935), American motivational speaker
 Roger Griswold (1762–1812), American politician
 Rufus Wilmot Griswold (1815–1857), American editor, critic, and anthologist
 Samuel Griswold (1790–1867), American industrial pioneer
 Samuel Griswold Goodrich (1793–1860), American author, better known under the pseudonym Peter Parley
 Stanley Griswold (1763–1815), American politician
 Tom Griswold (born 1953), American radio host
 William Griswold (disambiguation), several people
 Zona Maie Griswold (1889-1961), American singer

Fictional characters
 Clark Griswold, in National Lampoon's Vacation film series
 Gus Griswald, in the Recess television series

References

See also
 Justice Griswold (disambiguation)